Nagiripalle is a small village near Kalikiri in Annamayya district of Andhra Pradesh, India. The family of 16th chief minister of Andhra Pradesh Nallari Kiran Kumar Reddy hails from Nagiripalli.

Villages in Annamayya district